Bikelé (place): town in Estuaire Province in northwestern Gabon
 Bikélé (people): ethnic group in Cameroon
 Bikélé language: another name for Kol language (Cameroon)